Manfred Krifka (born 26 April 1956 in Dachau) is a German linguist. He is the director of the Leibniz Centre for General Linguistics (Leibniz-Zentrum Allgemeine Sprachwissenschaft, ZAS) in Berlin, a professor at the Humboldt University of Berlin, and editor of the academic journal Theoretical Linguistics.

Career and education 

Krifka graduated from the Ludwig Maximilian University of Munich in 1986 in Theoretical Linguistics, Philosophy and Theory of Science, and Psycholinguistics. He consequently held positions at the University of Tübingen 1986 - 1989, at the University of Texas at Austin 1990-2000, and at Humboldt University of Berlin 2000 - current. He has been the director of the Leibniz Centre for General Linguistics (ZAS) since 2001.

Work 

Krifka's main areas of research are linguistic semantics, pragmatics, language typology and Melanesian languages, especially languages of Ambrym. He has done substantial works on the meaning of nouns, in particular mass nouns and count nouns, on grammatical aspect, generic sentences, polarity items, information structure, questions and speech acts.

Notes and references

Bibliography 

 Krifka, Manfred (1998). "The Origins of Telicity". Pages 197–235 in S. Rothstein (ed.). Events and grammar. Dordrecht: Kluwer Academic Press.

External links 
 Manfred Krifka — official staff page at ZAS
 Works by Manfred Krifka — bibliography at PhilPapers
 Dinner at Amadeus after the conference — photo of Krifka after the fourth Formal Semantics in Moscow Conference (FSiM 4, 2008) [taken by Barbara Partee and uploaded at Flickr]
 Theoretical Linguistics — official website of the journal

Linguists from Germany
Living people
1956 births